Robin Jowitt is a professional rugby league footballer who played in the 2000s.

References

External links
Stanley Rangers ARLFC - Roll of Honour

Dewsbury Rams players
Featherstone Rovers players
Newcastle Thunder players
Living people
Place of birth missing (living people)
 English rugby league players
Rugby league props
Year of birth missing (living people)